Lynn Fuchs is an educational psychologist known for research on instructional practice and assessment, reading disabilities, and mathematics disabilities. She is the Dunn Family Chair in Psychoeducational Assessment in the Department of Special Education at Vanderbilt University.

Fuchs was featured in Forbes Magazine in 2009 as one of 14 "revolutionary educators" nationwide. In 2013, she was awarded with the Kauffman-Hallahan Distinguished Researcher Award, presented by the Division of Research of The Council for Exceptional Children and Routledge Press, for research leading to more effective services for children and youth with disabilities. In 2014, Fuchs and her husband Douglas Fuchs received the American Educational Research Association (AERA) Distinguished Contributions to Research in Education Award. In 2015, she was invited to the White House as part of the Individuals with Disabilities Education Act 40th anniversary.

Fuchs is one of the co-authors of Learning disabilities: From identification to intervention published in 2007. She co-edited the book Response to Intervention: A Framework for Reading Educators published in 2008.

Biography 
Fuchs completed a B.A. in humanities at Johns Hopkins University in 1972, and a M.S. in elementary education at the University of Pennsylvania Graduate School of Education in 1973. She continued her education at the University of Minnesota, where she received an Ed.S. in educational psychology in 1977 and a Ph.D. in educational psychology in 1981. She was a postdoctoral associate from 1981 to 1983 at the University of Minnesota Institute for Research on Learning Disabilities.  Fuchs was an assistant professor at Wheelock College (1981–1985) prior to joining the faculty of Vanderbilt University in 1985. Her research has been supported by grants from the National Institute of Child Health & Human Development.

Fuchs has served on the editorial boards of various journals including the Journal of Educational Psychology, Scientific Studies of Reading, Reading Research Quarterly, Elementary School Journal, Journal of Learning Disabilities, and Exceptional Children.

Research 
Fuchs and her team aim to identify instructional methods, including tutoring, that improve learning outcomes for students with learning disabilities in reading and mathematics. She has promoted use of formative assessment to enhance instructional effectiveness, and advocates for educational approaches that use responsiveness to intervention to identify children with persistent difficulties. Other research has focused on identifying cognitive profiles associated with math and reading difficulties, which may include slower processing speed or inattention.

Fuchs and her colleagues received the 1998 AERA Palmer O. Johnson Award for their paper "Peer-assisted learning strategies: Making classrooms more responsive to diversity." This study demonstrated the effectiveness of a 15-week peer tutoring program for enhancing reading success in elementary school classrooms.

In 2015, Fuchs and her colleagues were awarded the International Literacy Association’s Albert J. Harris Research Award for their paper "“Efficacy of a first-grade responsiveness-to-intervention prevention model for struggling readers" published in Reading Research Quarterly. This paper indicated significant gains in first-grade reading for children assigned to a small-group supplemental tutoring program after being identified as non-responders to standard reading instruction.

Fuchs and her co-author Sarah Powell received the 2016 Samuel A. Kirk Award from the Division of Learning Disabilities of the Council for Exceptional Children for their paper "Intensive intervention in mathematics" published in Learning Disabilities Research and Practice. This paper describes evidence-based individualized approaches to instruction for students who exhibit persistent difficulties in mathematics.

Representative publications 

 

 Fletcher, J. M., Lyon, G. R., Fuchs, L. S., & Barnes, M. A. (2018). Learning disabilities: From identification to intervention. Guilford Publications.

References

External links 
 Faculty Homepage
 

American women psychologists
21st-century American psychologists
Educational psychologists
Vanderbilt University faculty
Johns Hopkins University alumni
University of Pennsylvania alumni
University of Minnesota College of Education and Human Development alumni
Living people
Year of birth missing (living people)
American women academics